Sultan Ahmed (born 11 October 1989) is a Pakistani-born cricketer who plays for the United Arab Emirates national cricket team. He made his Twenty20 International (T20I) debut for the United Arab Emirates against Papua New Guinea on 12 April 2017. In April 2019, he was named in the UAE's One Day International (ODI) squad for their series against Zimbabwe. He made his ODI for the UAE against Zimbabwe on 10 April 2019.

In September 2019, he was named in the United Arab Emirates' squad for the 2019 ICC T20 World Cup Qualifier tournament in the UAE. In December 2020, he was one of ten cricketers to be awarded with a year-long full-time contract by the Emirates Cricket Board.

References

External links
 

1989 births
Living people
Emirati cricketers
Sialkot Stallions cricketers
United Arab Emirates One Day International cricketers
United Arab Emirates Twenty20 International cricketers
People from Gujranwala
Pakistani emigrants to the United Arab Emirates
Pakistani expatriate sportspeople in the United Arab Emirates